Norwegian Property is a real estate company that has a portfolio in Oslo and Stavanger, Norway. Created in 2006 and listed on the Oslo Stock Exchange, it invests in major commercial real estate, offering its owners a publicly traded real estate portfolio, consisting of 762,000 square meters bought for NOK 19 billion.

The corporation was created in 2006 by Anders Wilhelmsen Group and Fram Management and was listed on the Oslo Stock Exchange on November 15, 2006.

References

External links

Real estate companies of Norway
Companies listed on the Oslo Stock Exchange